Østre Toten is a municipality in Innlandet county, Norway. It is located in the traditional district of Toten. The administrative centre of the municipality is the village of Lena. Other villages in the municipality include Kapp, Kolbu, Kraby, Lensbygda, Nordlia, Skreia, and Sletta.

The  municipality is the 193rd largest by area out of the 356 municipalities in Norway. Østre Toten is the 83rd most populous municipality in Norway with a population of 14,827.

General information

The parish of Østre Toten was established as a municipality on 1 January 1838 (see formannskapsdistrikt law). On 1 January 1875, there was a border change between Vestre Toten Municipality and Østre Toten Municipality. On 1 January 1896, a small area of Østre Toten (population: 49) was transferred to the neighboring Vardal Municipality. During the 1960s, there were many municipal mergers across Norway due to the work of the Schei Committee. On 1 January 1964, the neighboring Kolbu Municipality (population: 2,909) was merged with Østre Toten to form a new, larger Østre Toten Municipality.

Etymology
The municipality was named Østre Toten because of its location in the traditional district of Toten. The first element Østre means "eastern" since it makes up the eastern part of the district. The last element is Toten which is assumed to be related to the noun þóttr which means approximately "something enjoyable".

Coat of arms
The coat of arms was granted on 27 March 1987. The official blazon is "Vert a potato plant argent". This means the arms have a green field (background) and the charge is a potato plant. The potato plant has a tincture of argent which means it is colored white or if it is made out of metal, then it is silver. The green color in the field symbolizes the importance of agriculture in the municipality and the potato was chosen since that is a particularly important crop in the municipality. The arms were designed by Arne Løvstand.

Churches
The Church of Norway has five parishes within the municipality of Østre Toten. It is part of the Toten prosti (deanery) in the Diocese of Hamar.

Geography
Østre Toten is bordered to the west by Vestre Toten, to the north by Gjøvik, as well as by Hurdal and Eidsvoll in neighboring Akershus county.

Settlement in Østre Toten is predominantly dispersed. In January 2015, 42.6% of the population lived in areas defined as urban settlements by Statistics Norway, compared to 81% for Norway as a whole. The urban settlements in Østre Toten are Kapp, Kolbu, Lena, Lensbygda, Nordlia, Skreia and Sletta.

History

According to the sagas, Halfdan Hvitbeinn (Whiteleg) was the first Yngling in Norway. He conquered Romerike, part of Hedmark, part of Vestfold, and Toten. He was killed in Toten around the year 740.

In 1021, according to saga, King Olaf (reigned 1015–1028) converted Toten to Christianity. Also, King Håkon IV (reigned 1217–1263) came to Toten around the year 1226 to settle local unrest.

Christian II (1481–1559) was a Danish monarch and King of Denmark and Norway from 1513–1523 and also the King of Sweden from 1520–1521, under the Kalmar Union. Prior to becoming king, Duke Christian was sent to Norway in 1506 by John II (also called Hans), King of Norway (1483–1513) to take charge of the kingdom. In 1507, he became aware of a revolt in Hedmark. In early 1508, he took a force there, routing the rebellion. He then rowed across lake Mjøsa to Toten, capturing residents, imprisoning them in the vaulted cellar of the rectory in Østre Toten and torturing them there. As a result, he determined that Bishop Karl of Hamar had been behind the rebellion. With Bishop Karl as his captive, he was able to suppress the unrest.

Toten was a part of Akershus county until 1756, when it was became part of Oppland county. Lauritz Weidemann, Corporal Peder Balke, and Nels Dyhren from Toten attended the 1814 constitutional convention at Eidsvold.

Government
All municipalities in Norway, including Østre Toten, are responsible for primary education (through 10th grade), outpatient health services, senior citizen services, unemployment and other social services, zoning, economic development, and municipal roads. The municipality is governed by a municipal council of elected representatives, which in turn elect a mayor.

Municipal council
The municipal council  of Østre Toten is made up of 29 representatives that are elected to four year terms.  The party breakdown of the municipal council is as follows:

Mayor
The mayors of Østre Toten:

1838-1847: Peder Fauchald
1848-1849: Ole Larsen Hammerstad
1850-1856: Peder Fauchald
1856-1861: Ole Larsen Hammerstad 
1862-1865: Jacob Brager
1866-1869: Hans Henrik Thaulow Borchgrevink 
1870-1871: Ole Larsen Hammerstad
1872-1875: Carl Schjøll
1876-1877: Hans Laurits O. Hammerstad
1878-1893: Martin Adolf Andersen  
1894-1897: Peder Madsen Wang 
1898-1907: Adolf Rogneby
1908-1910: Peder Madsen Wang (LL)
1911-1913: Even Fodstad (LL)
1914-1922: Ole Weflen (AD) 
1923-1925: Kristian Ørud (Bp) 
1926-1928: Even Fodstad (Bp) 
1929-1931: Ole Aass (Bp) 
1932-1934: Ole Festad  (Bp) 
1935-1940: Einar Hermanrud (Ap)
1941-1943: Hans Rognerud (NS)
1943-1945: Nils Lundbæk (NS)
1945-1945: Per Gjestvang (NS)
1945-1967: Einar Hermanrud (Ap)
1968-1975: Fredrik Bredli (Ap)
1976-1983: Johan Nygaard (Ap)
1984-1991: Helge Røragen (Ap)
1992-1995: Hans Bjerregård (Ap)
1996-2003: Tor Finstad (Sp)
2004-2015: Hans Seierstad (Sp)
2015-2019: Guri Bråthen (Ap)
2019–present: Bror Helgestad (Sp)

Climate
Østre Toten has a subarctic climate (Dfc). It is very close to a continental climate as September averages  and May averages . Summer is the wettest time of year and winters are cold and snowy.

Economy
Østre Toten is one of the Innlandet's most productive farming municipalities. Østre Toten is Norway's largest producers of potatoes and onions. This is reflected in the municipality's coat of arms, which displays a potato plant. The KiMs factory (which produces potato chips) is located at Skreia.

Attractions
Among the town's most notable landmarks are the old Hoff Church and the rock carvings at Glemmestad near Kapp, now displayed in the Toten Museum.

Notable residents

Public Service 

 Ole Hannibal Sommerfelt (1753 at Sukkestad – 1821) a jurist, civil servant and topographer
 Lauritz Weidemann (1775 in Sukkestad – 1856) a Norwegian judge, civil servant and politician
 Niels Fredriksen Dyhren (1778 in Østre Toten – 1866) & Peder Paulsen Balke (1779 in Østre Toten –1840) farmers, non-commissioner military officers and reps. at the Norwegian Constitutional Assembly
 Eduard Bøckmann (1849 in Østre Toten – 1927) a Norwegian-American ophthalmologist and physician
 E. W. Everson (1857 in Hveem - 1931) a pioneer homesteader in Dakota Territory
 Kristian Ørud (1878 at Skjefstad – 1946) a farmer and Mayor of  Østre Toten in the 1920s
 twins Adolf Bredo Stabell (1908 in Kolbu – 1996) a Norwegian diplomat & Peter Platou Stabell (1908 in Kolbu – 1992) a Norwegian barrister.
 Atle Ørbeck Sørheim (born 1933 in Østre Toten) a Norwegian veterinarian and civil servant

The Arts 
 Peder Balke (1804–1887) a painter of romantic and dramatic landscapes, lived in Toten
 Marie Wexelsen (1832 in Østre Toten – 1911) educator, poet, children's writer and novelist
 Leif Solberg (1914 in Lena – 2016) a Norwegian classical composer and organist
 Margit Sandemo (1924 in Lena – 2018) a Norwegian-Swedish historical fantasy author
 Svein Erik Brodal (born 1939 in Østre Toten) actor, theatre director, novelist and politician 
 Einar Steen-Nøkleberg (1944 in Østre Toten) a classical pianist and musical pedagogue
 Inger Lise Rypdal (born 1949 in Lena) a Norwegian singer and actress 
 Maj Britt Andersen (born 1956 in Østre Toten) a Norwegian singer
 Eldar Vågan (born 1960 in Kapp) songwriter and guitarist in Vazelina Bilopphøggers
 Knut Anders Sørum (born 1976 in Østre Toten) singer at the Eurovision Song Contest 2004

Sport 
 Alv Gjestvang (1937 in Østre Toten − 2016) a speed skater, bronze and silver medallist at the 1956 & 1964 Winter Olympics
 Arne Senstad (born 1969 in Kapp) a professional Norwegian handball coach
 Ruben Gabrielsen (born 1992 in Lena) a professional footballer with over 200 club caps

Sister cities
Østre Toten has sister city agreements with the following places:
  – Jammerbugt, Region Nordjylland, Denmark
  – Kesälahti, Itä-Suomi, Finland
  – Rättvik, Dalarna County, Sweden

References

External links

Municipal fact sheet from Statistics Norway 

 
Municipalities of Innlandet
1838 establishments in Norway